Breazeale is a surname. Notable people with the surname include:

Dominic Breazeale (born 1985), American boxer
Jim Breazeale (born 1949), American baseball player
Mack A. Breazeale (1930–2009), American physicist
Phanor Breazeale (1858–1934), American politician